Pierre Fourmanoir (1924–2007) was a French ichthyologist working mainly in New Caledonia. He described many new species of fish including several sharks.

Taxon described by him
See :Category:Taxa named by Pierre Fourmanoir

References

1924 births
2007 deaths
French ichthyologists
20th-century French zoologists